Invasion is a 1965 low-budget British science fiction film, directed by Alan Bridges for producer Jack Greenwood of Merton Park Studios.

Plot
An alien "Lystrian" spacecraft crash-lands on Earth, near a secluded hospital not far from London. The aliens, who are humanoid and resemble East Asians, are taken to a rural hospital after a collision with a car where they cause a forcefield to be raised around the building. The doctors are confused as the blood of the alien is not human.

An issue arises as the doctors are not able to determine if the alien is a law enforcement officer, or if the two other aliens are the law enforcement and the patient is their prisoner. Only the patient can speak English, further complicating matters.

Critical reception

The Encyclopedia of Science Fiction praises Alan Bridges' direction, saying that he "creates a powerfully strange atmosphere despite a very small budget." Creature Feature also liked the movie, giving it 3 out of 5 stars. It stated the movie was atmospheric and that the director gave the movie a peculiar ambiance. Moria found the idea to be good and liked the atmosphere, but that the movie was slow-moving.

Production

The film was written by Roger Marshall from a storyline by Robert Holmes. Holmes later re-used elements of his storyline in a 1970 Doctor Who serial entitled Spearhead from Space, which introduced Jon Pertwee as the Third Doctor. Made at Merton Park Studios, one of the last movies designed to be part of a double feature.

Release

Invasion opened at the ABC Lime Street cinema in Liverpool on 15 May 1966.

The film was theatrically released by Anglo-Amalgamated in the UK, and by American International Pictures in the United States.

A very brief video release by Warner Home Video was available in the UK in 1992.

A DVD version was re-released in November 2014 by Networkonair.

Cast 
 Edward Judd as Dr. Mike Vernon
 Yoko Tani as Leader of the Lystrians
 Valerie Gearon as Dr. Claire Harland
 Lyndon Brook as Brian Carter
 Eric Young as the Lystrian
 Tsai Chin as Nurse Lim
 Barrie Ingham as Major Muncaster
 Anthony Sharp as Lawrence Blackburn
 Glyn Houston as Police Sergeant Draycott
 Ann Castle as Sister Evans
 John Tate as Dundy
 Jean Lodge as Barbara Gough

References

External links 
 
 Invasion at British Horror Films  
Invasion at BFI Screenonline

1965 films
British science fiction films
1960s science fiction films
Films directed by Alan Bridges
British black-and-white films
1960s English-language films
1960s British films